Ronnie Simmons (born 26 August 1988) is an Australian-born LA based guitarist. He is a member of Faster Pussycat, Motochrist and Richie Ramone's touring band. He is a former member of The Art, The Hots, The Raskins, and has played live with Rose Tattoo, The Screaming Jets and Tommy Henriksen. In December 2022 he was named as Bob Spencer's replacement in Rose Tattoo.

Discography

Solo

The Hots

Motochrist

L.U.S.T.

References

External links
Official website

1988 births
Living people
Australian rock guitarists
21st-century guitarists